Saduria is a genus of benthic isopod crustaceans in the family Chaetiliidae, containing the following species:
 Saduria entomon (Linnaeus, 1758)
 Saduria megalura (G. O. Sars, 1879)
 Saduria sabini (Krøyer, 1849)
 Saduria sibirica (Birula, 1896)

References

Valvifera